Coe Isaac Crawford (January 14, 1858 – April 25, 1944) was an American attorney and politician from South Dakota.  He served as the sixth Governor and as a U.S. Senator.

Biography
A native of Volney, Iowa, Crawford graduated from the University of Iowa College of Law in 1882 and practiced law in Independence, Iowa before moving to Pierre, Dakota Territory in 1883. Active in politics as a Republican, Crawford served as Hughes County's prosecuting attorney in 1887 and 1888. In 1889, he was elected to the Territorial Council, the upper house of Dakota Territory's legislature.  After South Dakota achieved statehood in 1889, Crawford served in the South Dakota State Senate, and was Attorney General of South Dakota from 1893 to 1897.

In 1906, Crawford was the successful Republican nominee for governor, and he served from 1907 to 1909.  In 1908, he ran successfully for a seat in the U.S. Senate.  Crawford served one term, 1909 to 1915, and was an unsuccessful candidate for renomination in 1914.  After leaving the Senate, Crawford resumed practicing law in Huron, South Dakota.  He practiced until 1934, when he retired.  Crawford died in Yankton, South Dakota in 1944, and was buried at Oakland Cemetery in Iowa City, Iowa.

Early life and education
Crawford was born by Volney, in Allamakee County, Iowa. He attended the common schools and received additional instruction from a private tutor. In 1882, he graduated from the University of Iowa College of Law with a LL.B. degree. He began his practice in Independence, Iowa, moving to Pierre, in what was the Dakota Territory, in 1883. He was twice married; firstly to May Robinson and then to Lavinia Robinson. He had five children.

Career
He was the prosecuting attorney for Hughes County, South Dakota in 1887 and 1888. In 1889, he was elected to the Territorial Council, the upper house of the Dakota Territorial Legislature.

When South Dakota was admitted as a state in 1889, he was elected as a member of the first South Dakota State Senate. He went on to serve as the state Attorney General from 1893 to 1897. He ran for the United States House of Representatives seat for South Dakota in 1896, but lost the election. He then moved to Huron, South Dakota, and served as an attorney for the Chicago & North Western Railway from 1897 to 1903, when he resigned.

He was elected as a Republican to the position of Governor of South Dakota in 1907, and served in that capacity through 1909. He ran for the United States Senate that year, and won the election. He served in the Senate through 1915, and lost his bid for renomination in 1914. He then returned to Huron and the practice of law until 1934, when he retired from active business and political life.

Death
He died in Yankton, South Dakota in 1944. His burial was in Oakland Cemetery, Iowa City, Iowa.

References

External links
 
National Governors Association

1858 births
1944 deaths
People from Allamakee County, Iowa
Republican Party United States senators from South Dakota
Republican Party governors of South Dakota
South Dakota Attorneys General
Republican Party South Dakota state senators
Members of the Dakota Territorial Legislature
District attorneys in South Dakota
19th-century American politicians
People from Pierre, South Dakota
People from Huron, South Dakota
Iowa lawyers
South Dakota lawyers
University of Iowa College of Law alumni